{{DISPLAYTITLE:C10H20O}}
The molecular formula C10H20O (molar mass: 156.27 g/mol, exact mass: 156.1514 u) may refer to:

 Citronellol, also called dihydrogeraniol
 Decanal
 Menthol
 Rhodinol